Voskresensk is a town and the administrative center of Voskresensky District in Moscow Oblast, Russia, located upon the banks of the Moskva River  southeast from Moscow. Population:

History
It was founded in 1862. Town status was granted to it in 1938.

Administrative and municipal status
Within the framework of administrative divisions, Voskresensk serves as the administrative center of Voskresensky District. As an administrative division, it is, together with four rural localities, incorporated within Voskresensky District as the Town of Voskresensk. As a municipal division, the Town of Voskresensk is incorporated within Voskresensky Municipal District as Voskresensk Urban Settlement.

Transportation
There are station Voskresensk and stop platform 88 km at the Moscow-Ryazan line.

Notable residents

The town is home to several prominent ice hockey players, including Igor Larionov and other Soviet national team players, such as Vyacheslav Kozlov, Valeri Kamensky, Andrei Lomakin, Aleksandr Smirnov, Vladimir Golikov, Aleksandr Golikov, Alexander Ragulin, German Titov, Igor Ulanov, Sergei Berezin, Dmitri Kvartalnov, Roman Oksiuta and Valeri Zelepukin. Current Russian NHL players from Voskresensk include Andrei Markov, Andrei Loktionov, and Vladislav Namestnikov.

References

Notes

Sources

Cities and towns in Moscow Oblast
Populated places established in 1862
1862 establishments in the Russian Empire